Euphrosyne Doukaina Kamaterina or better Kamatera (– 1211) was a Byzantine Empress by marriage to the Byzantine Emperor Alexios III Angelos.

Euphrosyne was the daughter of Andronikos Kamateros, a high-ranking official who held the titles of megas droungarios and pansebastos and wife, an unknown Kantakouzene. She was related to the Emperor Constantine X and Irene Doukaina, empress of Alexios I Komnenos. Both of her brothers had rebelled against Andronikos I Komnenos; one was imprisoned and the other was blinded.

Life
Euphrosyne married Alexios Angelos, the older brother of the future Emperor Isaac II Angelos in c. 1169. Although Isaac II bestowed many titles and honors upon his brother, Alexios seized the throne on April 8, 1195, deposing Isaac and proclaiming himself emperor. In this he was assisted by Euphrosyne, who had organized a party of aristocratic supporters. Euphrosyne took control of the palace and quelled the opposition herself, securing the accession of her husband to the throne by wholesale bribery.

Euphrosyne was a dominating woman with a talent for politics, and she virtually ruled the Empire in the name of Alexios III, who was concerned primarily with pleasure and idle pursuits. She issued commands herself and even altered Alexios' decrees when it suited her, and secured the recall of the capable minister Constantine Mesopotamites. Euphrosyne and Alexios were criticized for their love of finery and the enrichment of their relatives at state expense. Her own brother, Basil Kamateros, and her son-in-law, Andronikos Kontostephanos, accused Euphrosyne of adultery with one of her ministers, a nobleman named Vatatzes. Alexios III believed the allegations and had Vatatzes executed. Euphrosyne was stripped of her imperial robes and banished to a convent at Nematarea in October 1196. However, her relatives convinced Alexios to reinstate her, and she was recalled six months later in spring 1197.

In 1203, faced with the Fourth Crusade and the return of his nephew, Alexios IV Angelos, Alexios III fled Constantinople with a magnificent treasure and some female relatives, including his daughter Irene. Euphrosyne was left behind and was immediately imprisoned by the new regime. Alexios IV was soon strangled by Alexios Doukas Mourtzouphlos, the lover of Euphrosyne's daughter Eudokia, who then proclaimed himself emperor as Alexios V. In April 1204 Euphrosyne fled the city along with her daughter and Alexios V, and they made their way to Mosynopolis, where Euphrosyne's husband Alexios III had taken refuge. Alexios III had Alexios V blinded and abandoned to the crusaders, who had him executed.

Euphrosyne and Alexios III fled across Greece to Thessalonica and Corinth, but were finally captured by Boniface of Montferrat and imprisoned. In 1209 or 1210 they were ransomed by their cousin Michael I of Epirus, and Euphrosyne spent the remainder of her life in Arta. She died in 1210 or 1211.

Family
By her husband, Alexios III Angelos, Euphrosyne had three daughters:
 Eirene Angelina, who married (1) Andronikos Kontostephanos; (2) Alexios Palaiologos, by whom she was the grandmother of Emperor Michael VIII Palaiologos.
 Anna Angelina, who married (1) the sebastokratōr Isaac Komnenos, great-nephew of Emperor Manuel I Komnenos; (2) Emperor Theodore I Laskaris of Nicaea.
 Eudokia Angelina, who married (1) King Stefan I Prvovenčani of Serbia; (2) Emperor Alexios V Doukas; (3) Leo Sgouros, ruler of Corinth.

Sources
The Oxford Dictionary of Byzantium, Oxford University Press, 1991
Garland, Lynda. Byzantine Empresses, 1999

1150s births
1211 deaths
Year of birth uncertain
Angelid dynasty
Christians of the Fourth Crusade
12th-century Byzantine empresses
13th-century Byzantine empresses
Euphrosyne Doukaina